Manitowoc Lutheran High School (MLHS) is a WELS Lutheran high school located in Manitowoc, Wisconsin. The school is affiliated with the Wisconsin Evangelical Lutheran Synod (WELS). The high school was founded in 1956, and has been located in its present campus since 1967.

The school typically has about 200 enrolled students. The school's mascot is the Lancer and its colors are red and grey. MLHS is a member of The Big East of the Wisconsin Interscholastic Athletic Association (WIAA).

Notable alumni 
Garth Neustadter, class of 2005, Emmy Award-winning composer and instrumentalist

References

External links
 Official site

Private high schools in Wisconsin
Lutheran schools in Wisconsin
Schools in Manitowoc County, Wisconsin
Educational institutions established in 1956
Secondary schools affiliated with the Wisconsin Evangelical Lutheran Synod
1956 establishments in Wisconsin